A hemiacetal or a hemiketal has the general formula R1R2C(OH)OR, where R1 or R2 is hydrogen or an organic substituent. They generally result from the addition of an alcohol to an aldehyde or a ketone, although the latter are sometimes called hemiketals. Most sugars are hemiacetals.

Nomenclature
According to the IUPAC definition, in R1R2C(OH)OR R1 and R2 may or may not be a hydrogen. In a hemiketal, neither R-group can be a hydrogen. Hemiketals are regarded as hemiacetals where none of the R-groups are H, and are therefore a subclass of the hemiacetals. The Greek prefix hèmi means half, refers to the fact that a single alcohol has been added to the carbonyl group, in contrast to acetals or ketals, which are formed when a second alkoxy group has been added to the structure.

Cyclic hemiacetals and hemiketals are sometimes called lactols. They often form readily, especially when they are 5- and 6-membered rings. In this case an intramolecular OH group reacts with the carbonyl group. Glucose and many other aldoses exist as cyclic hemiacetals whereas fructose and similar ketoses exist as cyclic hemiketals.

Formation 

Solutions of simple aldehydes in alcohols mainly consist of the hemiacetal. The equilibrium is easily reversed and dynamic. The equilibrium is sensitive to steric effects.

Hemiacetals in nature
Arguably, the most common hemiacetals are sugars, for example glucose.  The favorability of the formation of a strain-free six-membered ring and the electrophilicity of an aldehyde combine to strongly favor the acetal form.

Reactions
Hemiacetals and hemiketals may be thought of as intermediates in the reaction between alcohols and aldehydes or ketones, with the final product being an acetal or a ketal:
R2C=O + R'OH ⇌ R2C(OH)(OR')
R2C(OH)(OR') + R'OH ⇌ R2C(OR')2 + H2O
Usually, the second reaction is unfavorable.  In the presence of a dehydrating agent, it proceeds.

References 

Functional groups
Hemiacetals